The Very Reverend Dr Robert Andrew Willis KStJ DL (born 17 May 1947) is an Anglican priest, theologian, chaplain and hymn writer. He was Dean of Canterbury from 2001 to 2022, having previously served as Dean of Hereford between 1992 and 2000. During the COVID-19 pandemic, after public worship was suspended, Willis received media attention for his popular daily video broadcasts of Morning Prayer from the deanery garden at Canterbury Cathedral.

Family and education
Willis was born in 1947 to Thomas Willis, who worked at an aircraft company, and Vera Britton. His elder sister Pauline (1939–2020) was a journalist who wrote for The Guardian.

Willis was educated at Kingswood Grammar School in Kingswood, near Bristol. After graduating from Warwick University with a BA degree, he studied for ordination at Ripon College Cuddesdon and completed a Diploma in Theology (DipTh) at Worcester College, Oxford.

Early ordained ministry
Willis was ordained in the Church of England as a deacon in 1972 and a priest in 1973. He served as curate of St Chad's in Shrewsbury from 1972 to 1975 and was a vicar choral of Salisbury Cathedral and chaplain of Salisbury Cathedral School from 1975 to 1978. From 1978 to 1987 he was team rector of Tisbury, Wiltshire, and served as chaplain of Cranborne Chase School and RAF Chilmark.

In 1987 Willis became vicar of Sherborne Abbey, a former cathedral and abbey in Dorset. In addition, he was chaplain to Sherborne School for Girls. He was appointed canon and prebendary of Salisbury Cathedral in 1988 and served as rural dean of Sherborne from 1991 to 1992.

In November 1992 Willis was instituted as Dean of Hereford, primus inter pares (first among equals) of the governing body of Hereford Cathedral. In addition, he was priest-in-charge of St John's Church, Hereford. 

In 1995 he became a member of the General Synod of the Church of England, and in 1999 he was elected chair of the Deans' and Provosts' Conference. He continued to chair its successor, the Deans' Conference, when it was created in 2002.

Dean of Canterbury
In 2001 Willis was appointed Dean of Canterbury, becoming the 39th person to hold the position since the Reformation. His installation took place on 1 July 2001.

COVID-19 pandemic broadcasts
During the COVID-19 pandemic, the Church of England suspended public worship. In response, Willis, filmed by his civil partner Fletcher, began to broadcast religious services from the deanery garden at Canterbury Cathedral. His video recordings of the daily service of Morning Prayer were watched by thousands of people around the world who dubbed themselves the "Garden Congregation". By the time the Dean's retired in May 2022, he had produced well over 900 broadcasts and had cumulatively accrued millions of views on Youtube and other platforms around the world, reaching many who needed a point of contact, spiritual or otherwise, in the dark days of the lockdowns. The broadcasts 
were also downloaded and shared between Christian communities in parts of the world where it is dangerous for them to gather together or worship openly.The broadcasts followed the traditional pattern of daily morning prayer in the Anglican Church, built around the daily reading of Scripture and saying the pasalms. The interweaving of all aspects of human history and creativity in arts, music, philosophy, literature into these services which were filmed all over the house and gardens from the pigsty to the roof, gained global appeal. The broadcasts celebrated noteworthy days such as Thanksgiving, Jewish New Year and Chinese New Year, making them truly global and ecumenical, and the content drew heavily on the Dean's fifty years of ministry experience and keen concern for nature and the environment to draw attention to issues around the world. 

In May 2020 he received international media attention when his cat, Leo, walked between his legs and into his cassock. A similar incident occurred in July 2020, when another one of his cats, Tiger, began to drink from a jug of milk that had been positioned next to Willis. A third incident occurred during Willis's broadcast on Shrove Tuesday 2021, when Tiger stole a pancake that was next to Willis.

Retirement and legacy
On 16 February 2022 it was announced that Willis would retire as Dean of Canterbury on 16 May.

Hymn writing
Willis has written a number of hymns, some of which have been published in the latest edition of Hymns Ancient and Modern. His hymns include "Let Us Light a Candle", "Earth's Fragile Beauties We Possess" and "The Kingdom is Upon You". He also wrote the Christmas carol "Heaven Responds at Bethlehem", set to a tune by George Butterworth, which was sung for the first time by the Canterbury Cathedral girls' choir at the cathedral's carol services in 2016.

Willis is also an accomplished pianist and opera enthusiast.

Honours
Willis was appointed a Commander of the Venerable Order of Saint John (CStJ) in 2001 and a Knight in 2009 (although the Order does not grant the use of the prefix "Sir"). In 2011 he was appointed a deputy lieutenant of the county of Kent. He was awarded the Cross of St Augustine by the Archbishop of Canterbury, Dr Rowan Williams, in 2012.

He was awarded an honorary Doctor of Divinity (DD) degree by the Berkeley Divinity School at Yale University in 2009 and an honorary Doctor of Civil Law (DCL) degree by the University of Kent in 2011.

References

External links
 Profile in Debrett's People of Today

1947 births
Living people
Alumni of the University of Warwick
Alumni of Ripon College Cuddesdon
Alumni of Worcester College, Oxford
English Anglican theologians
Church of England deans
Deans of Hereford
Deans of Canterbury
Deputy Lieutenants of Kent
Fellows of Canterbury Christ Church University
Knights of the Order of St John
Recipients of the Cross of St Augustine
Members of the General Synod of the Church of England
People educated at King's Oak Academy
English hymnwriters